Crubeen may refer to:

Crubeen, Ireland, a townland in Ireland
Crubeens, an Irish food made of boiled pigs' feet
Crubeen (band), a 1970s Irish folk band from Newry, County Down, Northern Ireland